Kirk Cameron Jones (born March 28, 1974) is a former American football center for the Denver Broncos from 1997-2000.  Played college football at the University of Miami from 1993-1996 at the position of Center.  Jones was inducted into the University of Miami Sports Hall of Fame in 2008.

Jones was interviewed about his time at the University of Miami for the documentary The U, which premiered December 12, 2009 on ESPN.

References

External links
Pro Football Reference page

1974 births
Living people
People from Midland, Texas
American football centers
Miami Hurricanes football players
Denver Broncos players